Suillus cavipes is an edible species of mushroom in the genus Suillus. It is found in Europe and North America. It is associated with larch in the Pacific Northwest.

The brownish cap is dry, scaly, sometimes with veil remnants on the edge. The pores are buff. The stipe is yellowish above, sometimes with a slight ring, and cap-colored below; it is hollow, hence the epithet cavipes (Latin: 'hollow foot').

See also
List of North American boletes

References

External links

Edible fungi
Fungi of Europe
Fungi of North America
Fungi described in 1836
cavipes